Alamdar-e Sofla (also Romanized as ‘Alamdār-e Soflá; also known as ‘Alamdār-e Pā’īn and ‘Alamdār Sufla) is a village in Muzaran Rural District, in the Central District of Malayer County, Hamadan Province, Iran. At the 2006 census, its population was 176, in 56 families.

References 

Populated places in Malayer County